Equative is a case prototypically expressing the standard of comparison of equal values ("as… as a …"). The equative case has been used in very few languages in history. It was used in the Sumerian language, where it also took on the semantic functions of the essive case ("in the capacity of…") and similative case ("like a…").

For Sumerian, the equative was formed by adding the suffix -gin7 to the end of a noun phrase. In its similative function:

For Ossetic it is formed by the ending -ау [aw]:

It is found subdialectally in some speakers of the Khalkha dialect of Mongolian, where it is formed by the endings -цаа [tsaa], -цоо [tsoo], -цээ [tsee] or -цөө [tsöö], depending on the vowel harmony of the noun. It is quite rare and very specific, referring to the height or level of an object:

It is also found in the Turkic Khalaj language and in languages from South America like Quechua, Aymara, Uro and Cholón.

Welsh, though it has no equative case of nouns, has an equative degree of adjectives, shown normally by the suffix -ed: for example, "hyned" (â ...), meaning "as old" (as ...).

Sireniki Eskimo had an equative (or comparative) case for describing similarities between nouns.

See also
List of grammatical cases

References

External links
SIL definition of equative case

Grammatical cases